Marcus Christian Jensen (born December 14, 1972) is an American professional baseball player and coach. He played as a catcher for the San Francisco Giants, Detroit Tigers, Milwaukee Brewers, St. Louis Cardinals, Minnesota Twins, Boston Red Sox and Texas Rangers in Major League Baseball (MLB) from 1996 through 2002. After retiring as a player, Jensen coached and managed in the minor leagues. In 2015, he was the coach for the Oakland Athletics of MLB.

Playing career
Jensen attended Skyline High School in Oakland, California. The San Francisco Giants of Major League Baseball (MLB) selected Jensen in the first round, with the 33rd overall selection, of the 1990 MLB Draft. He made his MLB debut in 1996. Though he was labeled the Giants' "catcher of the future", he struggled, and was traded to the Detroit Tigers in July 1997 in exchange for Brian Johnson. He played for the Milwaukee Brewers in 1998, the St. Louis Cardinals in 1999, the Minnesota Twins in 2000, the Boston Red Sox and the Texas Rangers in 2001, and the Brewers in 2002.

Jensen played for the United States national baseball team in the 1999 Pan American Games, and the 2000 Summer Olympics.

Jensen also spent time in the New York Yankees organization in 2003, the independent Golden Baseball League from 2005 to 2006.

Coaching career
In January 2007, Jensen retired as an active player to become a hitting coach in the Oakland Athletics organization. From 2009 through 2013, he was the manager of the Arizona Athletics of the Rookie-level Arizona League.

Jensen succeeded Todd Steverson as the Athletics' the minor league roving hitting instructor for Athletics after the 2013 season. After the 2014 season, he was named the assistant hitting coach on the Athletics' Major League roster.

Personal life
Jensen's son, Marcus Proctor, was chosen by the Tampa Bay Rays in the 2009 MLB Draft.

References

External links
, or Retrosheet, or Sports Reference Olympic Sports, or Pura Pelota (Venezuelan Winter League)

1972 births
Living people
African-American baseball coaches
African-American baseball managers
African-American baseball players
American expatriate baseball players in Mexico
Arizona League Giants players
Baseball players at the 1999 Pan American Games
Baseball players at the 2000 Summer Olympics
Baseball coaches from California
Baseball players from Oakland, California
Boston Red Sox players
Clinton Giants players
Columbus Clippers players
Detroit Tigers players
Everett Giants players
Indianapolis Indians players
Langosteros de Cancún players
Louisville Redbirds players
Major League Baseball catchers
Major League Baseball hitting coaches
Medalists at the 2000 Summer Olympics
Memphis Redbirds players
Mesa Miners players
Milwaukee Brewers players
Minnesota Twins players
Minor league baseball managers
Oakland Athletics coaches
Oklahoma RedHawks players
Olympic gold medalists for the United States in baseball
Pan American Games medalists in baseball
Pan American Games silver medalists for the United States
Pawtucket Red Sox players
Phoenix Firebirds players
Reno Silver Sox (Golden Baseball League) players
Salt Lake Buzz players
San Francisco Giants players
San Jose Giants players
Shreveport Captains players
St. Louis Cardinals players
Texas Rangers players
Tiburones de La Guaira players
American expatriate baseball players in Venezuela
Toledo Mud Hens players
Medalists at the 1999 Pan American Games
21st-century African-American sportspeople
20th-century African-American sportspeople
Skyline High School (Oakland, California) alumni